Chris Lewis (born 9 March 1957) is a New Zealand former professional tennis player. Lewis reached the 1983 Wimbledon singles final as an unseeded player. He won three singles titles and achieved a career-high singles ranking of world No. 19 in April 1984. He also won eight doubles titles during his 12 years on the tour. Lewis was coached by Harry Hopman and Tony Roche.

Lewis is the third (and as of 2021 the most recent) man from New Zealand to reach a major singles final, after Anthony Wilding at the 1913 Wimbledon Championships and Onny Parun at the 1973 Australian Open.

Early life
Lewis was born in Auckland, New Zealand, and received his secondary education at Marcellin College and Lynfield College. He is the eldest of three sons. His brothers are David Lewis and Mark Lewis who also had competitive tennis careers.

Tennis career

Juniors
Lewis reached the No. 1 junior world ranking in 1975, winning the Wimbledon boys' singles title (def. Ricardo Ycaza) and reaching the final of the US Open boys' singles (lost to Howard Schoenfield).

Pro tour
In reaching the 1983 Wimbledon final, after a five-set win over Kevin Curren in the semifinals, Lewis became the seventh unseeded man and only the second New Zealander after Anthony Wilding (who won four times between 1910 and 1913) to reach a Wimbledon singles final. He lost the final to John McEnroe in three sets. He also reached the final at the Cincinnati Masters in 1981, again losing to John McEnroe in straight sets.

After tennis
In the 1999 New Zealand general election, Lewis unsuccessfully stood for parliament as a list candidate for the Libertarianz party. Now a resident in Irvine, California, Lewis is the co-founder of the Brymer Lewis Tennis Academy, based at the Orange County Great Park Sports Complex in Irvine. His daughter Geneva Lewis, born 1998, is a violinist.

Equipment
Lewis was the first man in history to reach the final of one of the four tennis majors (Australian Open, French Open, Wimbledon, US Open) while using an oversize racquet, a Prince original graphite (second only to Pam Shriver in the 1978 US Open). He was also one of the early players equipped with custom made shoes designed for the grass surface.

Grand Slam finals

ATP Masters Series finals

Career finals

Singles: 10 (3 titles, 7 runner-ups)

Doubles: 16 (8 titles, 8 runner-ups)

Grand Slam singles performance timeline

Note: The Australian Open was held twice in 1977, in January and December.

References

External links
 
 
 

1957 births
Living people
Libertarianz politicians
New Zealand expatriate sportspeople in the United States
New Zealand libertarians
New Zealand male tennis players
New Zealand tennis coaches
People educated at Marcellin College, Auckland
Sportspeople from Irvine, California
Tennis people from California
Tennis players from Auckland
Unsuccessful candidates in the 1999 New Zealand general election
Wimbledon junior champions
People educated at Lynfield College
Grand Slam (tennis) champions in boys' singles